Kouts is a surname. Notable people with the surname include:

 Herbert J.C. Kouts (1919–2008), American nuclear physicist and engineer
 Tarmo Kõuts, Estonian politician and military commander
 William Walter Kouts (born 1922), United States Army officer

See also
 Kouts (disambiguation)